The Galleria Giorgio Franchetti alla Ca' d'Oro is an art museum located in the Ca' d'Oro on the Grand Canal in Venice, Italy.

History
The Baron Giorgio Franchetti (1865–1922), was born to a prominent family of Turin. Initially trained in a military school, he preferred the study of music and collecting art. He married in 1890 the Baroness Maria Hornstein Hohenstoffeln. However, by 1891 he had moved to Venice, and there soon purchased the then dilapidated Ca' d'Oro and set upon restoring the building, as possible, to its 15th-century layout.

Franchetti also traveled widely to purchase objects for the palace, including in Paris the palace's original well head (1427) by Bartolomeo Bon. He supervised much of the restoration, added the mosaic floor collections, and constructed a chapel to house his Mantegna St Sebastian. The inner courtyard mosaic was designed by the Baron himself. His grandson helped further his wish, stated in 1916, to make the house and his collection a museum. The palace officially became a museum inaugurated on January 18, 1927.

Notable works 
See also :Category:Paintings in the collection of the Galleria Giorgio Franchetti alla Ca' d'Oro
The Baron's collection form the nucleus of the displays, which are augmented by other works from local buildings. The Baron's tomb is on the premises. Among the works on display are:
Apollo del Belvedere by Jacopo Bonacolsi also called l'Antico
Medal depicting Leonello d'Este by Pisanello
Medal depicting Gianfrancesco Gonzaga
Medal depicting Sigismondo Malatesta 
Medal depicting Don Iñigo d'Avalos
Medal depicting Vittorino da Feltre
Medal depicting Sultan Mehmed II by Gentile Bellini 
Medal depicting Lorenzo and Giuliano de' Medici by Bertoldo di Giovanni
Madonna and Child (15th century) by Michele Giambono
Madonna and Child (15th century) by the studio of Alvise Vivarini
Madonna della Misericordia and Stories of St Bartholemew, polyptych by Simone da Cusighe
Wooden ceiling from Palazzo Giustiniani alla Fava
Bronze relief with animals by Bartolomeo Bellano 
Bronze statuette of Education about Love by Venus in the Foundry of Vulcan attributed to Bertoldo di Giovanni 
Bronze copy of lo Spinario attributed to Severo Calzetta
Bronze statuette of Winged Victory
Bronze statuette of Bacchus and Pomona by Pierino da Vinci
Bronze statuette of Winged Mercury by the school of Giambologna
Annunciation, Visitation, and Death of the Virgin (early 16th century) by Vittore Carpaccio
Christ of Piety between to Angels (1529) by Marco Palmezzano
Bronze statuette of Two Putti Musicians by Niccolò Roccatagliata 
Bronze statuette of Sleeping Youth by Tiziano Minio
Bronze statuette of Milo by Alessandro Vittoria 
Pieta with St Jerome, St John Evangelist, and Donor (1500s) by Giovanni Agostino da Lodi
Four Doctors of the Church (late 15th century) by Carlo Braccesco
Coronation of the Virgin by Andrea di Bartolo
Wedding Plate with scene of Ercole al Bivio by Gerolamo di Giovanni di Benvenuto
Birth Plate by Domenico di Bartolo
Madonna and Child by Francesco Botticini
Crucifixion by Giovanni Boccati
Story of Lucretia by Biagio di Antonio Tucci
Portrait of Marcello Durazzo (1622–1627) by Anthony van Dyck
Portrait of Procurator Nicolò Priuli (1545) by Jacopo Tintoretto
Venus before Mirror by Titian
Venus Sleeping by Paris Bordone
Bust of Procurator Marino Grimani by Alessandro Vittoria
David and Bathsheba (16th century) Belgian tapestry
St Sebastian by Andrea Mantegna
Double marble portrait by Tullio Lombardo
Charity of San Martin by Andrea Briosco also called il Riccio 
Madonna and Child, marble sculpture by Jacopo Sansovino
Last Supper, marble sculpture attributed to Tullio Lombardo 
St Jerome in prayer attributed to Daniel Hopfer 
Mourning over the Dead Christ attributed to the school of Dürer
Crucifixion by Jan van Eyck
Landscape with St Jerome by Studio of Joachim Patinir 
Veduta of the Temple of Sybil at Tivoli by Marten Ryckaert
Sleeping Woman by Gabriël Metsu
Winter Landscape by Adriaen van de Velde
Veduta di mare con vascelli by Willem van de Velde the younger
Still-life with Dog and Game by Jan Fyt 
Still life with uccelli palustri by David de Coninck
Exile of Adam and Eve from Paradise, Christ and the Samaritan, and Christ and the Magdalen, frescoes by Pordenone
Virtues, frescoes by Domenico Campagnola
Facade frescoes (degraded) by Titian for Fondaco dei Tedeschi
Rio della Plata, terracotta model for Fountain of the Four Rivers, by Gian Lorenzo Bernini
Mythologic subjects, terracotta by Stefano Maderno 
Sketches for Telamons for Library of San Giovanni e Paolo by Giacomo Piazzetta
Veduta of the Piazetta towards San Giorgio by Francesco Guardi
Veduta of the Wharf towards the Salute by Francesco Guardi

References

Art museums established in 1927
Art museums and galleries in Venice